The AWA United States Championship was a short-lived title in the early days of the American Wrestling Association. It started out as the NWA United States Championship promoted in the Chicago, Illinois from 1953 until 1958. in 1958 then champion Verne Gagne created the American Wrestling Association (AWA) based on Minneapolis, Minnesota and took the championship with him, claiming the lineage of the Chicago version. The Chicago promotion recognized Wilbur Snyder as their next champion, splitting the lineage into their own  NWA United States Heavyweight Championship. The Minneapolis version of the championship was renamed the AWA United States Championship in 1960.

Title history

Footnotes

See also

AWA Superstars of Wrestling United States Championship, brief revival.
Professional wrestling in the United States

References

American Wrestling Association championships
National Wrestling Alliance championships
NWA United States Heavyweight Championships